The Danyang–Kunshan Grand Bridge is a  viaduct on the Beijing–Shanghai High-Speed Railway. It is the longest bridge in the world.

Bridge

The bridge is located on the rail line between Shanghai and Nanjing in Jiangsu province. It is in the Yangtze River Delta, where the geography is characterized by lowland rice paddies, canals, rivers, and lakes. It passes  through the northern edges of population centers (from west to east) beginning in Danyang, Changzhou, Wuxi, Suzhou, and ending in Kunshan. There is a  section over open water across Yangcheng Lake in Suzhou.

Construction was completed in 2010 and the bridge opened in 2011. Employing 10,000 people, the project took four years and cost about $8.5 billion. The bridge currently holds the Guinness World Record for the longest bridge in the world in any category .

Designer 
The China Road and Bridge Corporation (CRBC), a subsidiary of China Communications Construction Company designed and built the bridge. It is a Chinese government-funded company which was originally part of the Foreign Aid Office of the Ministry of Communications of China. This company leads major civil engineering projects in China like highways, railways, bridges, ports, and tunnels.

See also
 Jiaozhou Bay Bridge, also known as Qingdao Haiwan Bridge. Some sources mistakenly confuse the Danyang–Kunshan Bridge with the Jiaozhou Bay Bridge or a segment of it. The two bridges are unrelated.
 Hong Kong–Zhuhai–Macau Bridge
 List of longest bridges in the world

References

External links

Bridges completed in 2011
Bridges in Jiangsu
Railway bridges in China
2011 establishments in China